A pork chop bun is one of the most popular and famous snacks in Macau, and has been described as a Macau specialty.  Pork chop bun is derived from a Portuguese pork sandwich named .

The bun (piggy bun) is extremely crisp outside and very soft inside. A fried pork chop is filled into the bun horizontally. It has been described as "the Macanese version of a hamburger."

The ingredients of a pork chop bun are only a piece of bone-in pork chop and a lightly toasted and buttered bun.

See also

 
 Beef bun
 Char siu baau
 List of sandwiches
 List of buns
 List of pork dishes
 List of stuffed dishes

References

Macau cuisine
Buns
Cantonese cuisine
Pork sandwiches
Chinese pork dishes